Erick Salvador Andino Portillo (born 21 July 1989) is a Honduran football player.

Club career
Andino joined Victoria from Olimpia in January 2012, but returned for the 2012 Apertura and was ruled out for the season with a knee injury.

International career
Andino played for Honduras at the 2009 FIFA U-20 World Cup in Egypt.

International goals
Scores and results list Honduras' goal tally first.

References

External links
 

1989 births
Living people
People from San Pedro Sula
Association football midfielders
Honduran footballers
C.D. Olimpia players
C.D. Victoria players
F.C. Motagua players
Liga Nacional de Fútbol Profesional de Honduras players
Honduras international footballers
2015 CONCACAF Gold Cup players
2017 Copa Centroamericana players
Copa Centroamericana-winning players
2009 CONCACAF U-20 Championship players